Kerrick is a city in Pine County, Minnesota, United States. The population was 65 at the 2010 census.

Minnesota State Highway 23 serves as a main route in the community.

Geography

The communities of Nickerson, Duquette, Bruno, Askov, Sandstone, and Sturgeon Lake are all near Kerrick.

History
The city was named in honor of Cassius M. Kerrick, a master mechanic and conductor for the Great Northern Railway. However, originally the name "Kerrick" was applied to the neighboring Duquette. When the Great Northern Railway depot was moved three miles south, keeping that name, for a period Duquette was called Old Kerrick, the new site being called New Kerrick; the names were corrected when the Duquette post office was established in 1905.

Demographics

2010 census
As of the census of 2010, there were 65 people, 29 households, and 17 families living in the city. The racial makeup of the city was 95.4% White, 3.1% Native American, and 1.5% from two or more races.

There were 29 households, of which 31.0% had children under the age of 18 living with them, 41.4% were married couples living together, 3.4% had a female householder with no husband present, 13.8% had a male householder with no wife present, and 41.4% were non-families. 41.4% of all households were made up of individuals, and 17.2% had someone living alone who was 65 years of age or older. The average household size was 2.24 and the average family size was 2.88.

The median age in the city was 38.5 years. 24.6% of residents were under the age of 18; 4.6% were between the ages of 18 and 24; 23% were from 25 to 44; 33.9% were from 45 to 64; and 13.8% were 65 years of age or older. The gender makeup of the city was 53.8% male and 46.2% female.

2000 census
As of the census of 2000, there were 71 people, 28 households, and 19 families living in the city. The racial makeup of the city was 98.59% White, and 1.41% from two or more races.

There were 28 households, out of which 28.6% had children under the age of 18 living with them, 42.9% were married couples living together, 17.9% had a female householder with no husband present, and 28.6% were non-families. 28.6% of all households were made up of individuals, and 10.7% had someone living alone who was 65 years of age or older. The average household size was 2.54 and the average family size was 3.00.

In the city, the population was spread out, with 19.7% under the age of 18, 11.3% from 18 to 24, 32.4% from 25 to 44, 18.3% from 45 to 64, and 18.3% who were 65 years of age or older. The median age was 40 years. For every 100 females, there were 129.0 males. For every 100 females age 18 and over, there were 128.0 males.

The median income for a household in the city was $38,750, and the median income for a family was $38,750. Males had a median income of $37,250 versus $11,250 for females. The per capita income for the city was $14,324. There were no families and 2.7% of the population living below the poverty line, including no under eighteens and none of those over 64.

Education
The local school district is East Central Schools.

Notable people
 Becky Lourey - former senator
 Tony Lourey - current senator, since 2006

References

Cities in Minnesota
Cities in Pine County, Minnesota